Marie-Soleil Tougas (May 3, 1970 – August 10, 1997) was an actress and TV host based in Quebec, Canada.

Biography

Television career 
She began her career as a teenager in the role of Zoe in the soap opera Peau de banane, then continued as a young adult in Chop suey, Chambres en ville, Ent'Cadieux and Jasmine.

She also co-hosted the show Fort Boyard (with Guy Mongrain) and The Débrouillards alongside Gregory Charles. She appeared in numerous advertising campaigns including a campaign for condom use as well as those of Toyota dealers. She was well known as a spokesperson for the Éduc'alcool organization,  promoting responsible alcohol consumption, for her involvement in the cause of disabled children, and as a spokesperson for Operation Enfant Soleil and host of the annual telethon of the foundation.

Plane crash 
She died with her boyfriend Jean-Claude Lauzon when their plane crashed near Ungava Bay in northern Quebec on August 10, 1997. Patrice L'Écuyer and Gaston Lepage, who followed them in another plane, were the first to see the accident. The funerals were broadcast on TVA.

She is the sister of Sebastien Tougas, actor and advertising designer.

External links
 
  Marie-Soleil Tougas on CinéMémorial
Industry mourns Lauzon, Tougas
Il y a 20 ans disparaissaient Marie-Soleil Tougas et Jean-Claude Lauzon
Ils se souviennent de Marie-Soleil Tougas
Gregory Charles reparle de la mort de Marie-Soleil Tougas

1970 births
1997 deaths
Actresses from Quebec
Canadian television hosts
French Quebecers
Canadian soap opera actresses
20th-century Canadian actresses
Accidental deaths in Quebec
Canadian women television hosts
Victims of aviation accidents or incidents in Canada
Victims of aviation accidents or incidents in 1997